Alyas Robin Hood is a Philippine drama-action series broadcast by GMA Network starring Dingdong Dantes together with an ensemble cast. It premiered on September 19, 2016, on GMA Telebabad prime time block and also aired worldwide on GMA Pinoy TV. The first season ended its 23-week run on February 24, 2017, with a total of 115 episodes, and replaced by Destined to be Yours. 

The second season premiered on August 14, 2017, and ended November 24, 2017, after its 15-week run with 75 episodes, and was replaced by Kambal, Karibal. 

According to its producers the series was inspired by the English folklore Robin Hood.

Urban Luzon and NUTAM (Nationwide Urban Television Audience Measurement) ratings are provided by AGB Nielsen Philippines while Kantar Media Philippines provide Nationwide ratings (Urban + Rural).

Series overview

Episodes

Season 1 (2016–2017)

September 2016

October 2016

November 2016

December 2016

January 2017

February 2017

Season 2 (2017)

August 2017

September 2017

October 2017

November 2017

References

Lists of Philippine drama television series episodes
Lists of action television series episodes
Lists of crime television series episodes